Enos William McDonald (October 1, 1915–March 31, 1968), better known as Skeets McDonald,  was an American country and rockabilly musician popular during the 1950s and 60s. Best known for the Slim Willet-penned song "Don't Let the Stars Get in Your Eyes", McDonald was a devoted honky tonk singer and songwriter whose work helped to bridge the gap between country and rock and roll.

Biography

McDonald was born on October 1, 1915 in Greenway, Arkansas. He was the youngest of his parents' seven children; his gained his nickname for calling mosquitoes "skeets" as a child.  When his older brother moved to Detroit, Michigan the early 1930s, McDonald followed; and joined his first band, the Lonesome Cowboys, in 1935. He later formed his own band and played local clubs and on radio in Flint and Pontiac.

McDonald was drafted in 1943 and was stationed in North Africa and the Far East during World War II, earning a Bronze Star. On discharge, he returned to radio and television work in Dearborn, Michigan. He made his first recordings for Fortune Records in 1950 with Johnnie White and his Rough Riders, and cut records for London and Mercury Records as Skeets Saunders.

In 1951, McDonald moved to Los Angeles, California, where he became a regular on Cliffie Stone's Hometown Jamboree and later appeared on Town Hall Party. He was soon signed by Capitol Records, which viewed him as its answer to Columbia Records' Lefty Frizzell and demanded he continue releasing country songs rather than the rockabilly sound he experimented with since the war. He recorded more than 80 numbers for the label, including his 1952 smash country hit, "Don't Let the Stars Get in Your Eyes" (No. 1 for 18 weeks). In the late 1950s, he appeared on Ozark Jubilee and continued recording for Capitol; his last release for the label was the album, The Country's Best.

McDonald signed with Columbia in 1959 and spent the decade there, recording some excellent West Coast hillbilly, as well as some forays into the rockabilly. He employed young guitar-whiz Eddie Cochran to back him in the studio for "You Oughta See Grandma Rock" and "Heart Breaking Mama". Although they made little impact on the charts at the time, they are now considered rockabilly classics.

He scored several hits on the Billboard country chart, including "This Old Heart" (1960, No. 21), "Call Me Mr. Brown" (1963, No. 9), "Big Chief Buffalo Nickel (Desert Blues)" (1966, No. 29), and "Mabel" (1967, No. 28). He also appeared on the Grand Ole Opry and the Big D Jamboree in Dallas, Texas. His songs included "I'll Make Believe", "Big Family Trouble", "I Need Your Love" and "The Echo of Your Footsteps". In 1964, he released the album Call Me Skeets!.

McDonald made several film appearances, including Saddle Pals with Johnny Mack Brown, Ma and Pa Kettle Go to Town (1950), The Glenn Miller Story (1954) and Hud (1963), singing "Driftwood on the River" with Janet McBride.

In later years, McDonald moved his style more towards rock and roll; but refused to move far from the tearjerking songs which made his name. When told by reviewers he "belonged to another age," he took it as a compliment to his dedication.

McDonald died from a heart attack on March 31, 1968 in Los Angeles.

Discography

Albums

Singles

Notes

References

 .

External links

1915 births
Singer-songwriters from Arkansas
American male singer-songwriters
American country singer-songwriters
1968 deaths
20th-century American singers
Country musicians from Arkansas
20th-century American male singers